Vayyari Bhamalu Vagalamari Bhartalu is a 1982 Telugu-language comedy film, produced by R. V. Gurupadam under the G.R.P. Art Pictures banner and directed by Katta Subba Rao. It stars N. T. Rama Rao, Krishna, Sridevi and Raadhika, with music composed by Rajan–Nagendra.

Plot

The film is a funny comedy tale which revolves around two pairs. Pedda Babu and Chinna Babu are two brothers who belong to a Zamindar family, since their family is joint from generations, their elders want to continue the hierarchy in this generation also, so they decide to make siblings as their daughters-in-law. Simultaneously, there are two sisters Indumathi and Chandramathi, who are grown up with a lot of love and affection among each other, so they also want to marry brothers so they are not separated for the rest of their life. Both pairs see each other, fall in love and get married. After the marriage, maternal uncles of both brothers and sisters Ramalingam and Somalingam respectively, create disputes and ego clashes between the sisters, which lead to separation of the family. The rest of the film is about how both the brothers teach the lesson to their wives and reunite the family.

Cast

Soundtrack

Music composed by Rajan–Nagendra. Lyrics were written by Veturi. Music released by AVM Audio Company.

References

External links
 

Indian comedy films
Films scored by Rajan–Nagendra
1982 comedy films
1982 films
1980s Telugu-language films